Henri Drell (born 25 April 2000) is an Estonian professional basketball player for the Windy City Bulls of the NBA G League. He also represents the Estonian national basketball team internationally. Standing at 2.05 m (6 ft 9 in), he plays at the shooting guard and small forward positions.

Early life and youth career 
Drell was born in Tallinn, Estonia. He started playing basketball at age of 9 years old. He joined small club in Estonia. After that Drell moved to BC Kalev/Cramo youth.

In July 2016, Drell moved to Brose Bamberg, Germany, where he started to play German Under-19 Youth Bundesliga (NBBL- Nachwuchs-Basketball-Bundesliga). In May 2019, Drell led his NBBL team (TSV Breitengüßbach) to silver medal. On 27 February 2019, he was named to the 2019 NBBL All-Star Game.

In February 2018, Drell played for Brose Bamberg's U18 team at Adidas Next Generation Tournament (ANGT) in Munich. He was selected to the All-Tournament Team after leading the event with 27 points, 5.8 rebounds, 2.8 assists per game and a Performance Index Rating (PIR) of 26.3. Later in June, he also attended the NBA Global Camp in Treviso, Italy.

Professional career

Audentes (2015–2016) 
In September 2015, Drell joined his hometown team Audentes/Noortekoondis.

Brose Bamberg (2016–2019) 
On 1 July 2016, Drell signed a six-year contract with German club Brose Bamberg. He made his professional debut for Brose Bamberg on 18 March 2019, recording 2 points in a 100–74 win over Eisbären Bremerhaven.

Drell mainly played with Baunach Young Pikes, the farm team of Brose Bamberg, in German 2nd Division (ProA). In 2018-19 season Drell improved his stats to 13.1 points, 3.9 rebounds and 1.6 assists per game for Baunach in ProA action. On 2 February 2019 Drell was named the ProA Youngster Of The Month. Drell eventually became second in Pro A Young Player Of The Year voting.

On 19 April 2019, he declared for the 2019 NBA draft. ESPN ranked Drell 55th out of 100 draft prospects, later on Drell decided to withdraw from the draft to try to move up in the rankings for 2020 NBA draft.

Victoria Libertas Pesaro (2019–2021) 
On July 19, 2019, Drell signed with Italy's Victoria Libertas Pesaro of the Lega Basket Serie A. He made his professional debut for VL Pesaro on 22 September 2019, recording two points and three rebounds in 25 minutes and a 72–80 loss over Fortitudo Bologna. He recorded his then Lega Basket Serie A career-high 16 points on 13 October 2019 against Virtus Bologna, shooting 6-of-11 from the field with 4 rebounds in 33 minutes. However, the season was cancelled prematurely because of the COVID-19 pandemic.

In his second season with Victoria Libertas Pesaro under coach Jasmin Repeša, Drell played in 24 games and started in 12 and averaged 16.6 minutes per game, he made huge improvements throughout the season, mainly in shooting. He finished the season shooting 40% from the three-point line and 50% from the two-points range. On 24 January, Drell recorded his then new regular season-high of 17 points, including shooting 4-of-4 from three-point range, with three rebounds in a 107–83 win over S.Bernardo Cantù. On 12 January, Drell helped VL Pesaro to qualify for the Italian Basketball Cup after a ten-year drought for the team.

In February 2021, in a prestigious Italian Basketball Cup, Drell had a break-out tournament, where in quarter-finals he recorded his LBA career-high 23 points, shooting 7-of-9 from the field, with five rebounds in overtime 115–110 win over Dinamo Sassari. He helped his team to reach the seventh Italian Cup finals ever, by beating Happy Casa Brindisi in the semi-finals, but eventually losing to AX Armani Exchange Milano in the final, where Drell posted 12 points and four rebounds in 23 minutes. Drell was named the „Best Offensive Player“ in the tournament. He finished the tournament averaging 12.7 points, 3.3 rebounds, 1 assist per game, Drell had also the best shooting percentages in the tournament: 63.6% from the two-point range and 62.5% from the three-point range. He parted ways with the team on 30 November 2021.

Windy City Bulls / Chicago Bulls (2022–present) 
On January 15, 2022, NBA Draft eligible Drell was acquired via available player pool by the Windy City Bulls of the NBA G League.

In April 2022, Drell made history in the Windy City Bulls, becoming tenth in all-time blocks in the franchise history, with only 17.3 minutes per game over 29 games in the season.

After going undrafted in the 2022 NBA draft, he signed an NBA Summer League contract with the Chicago Bulls. Drell helped Chicago Bulls Summer League squad to finish with 4 wins and 1 loss while averaging 5 points per game, in 14.7 minutes per game.

On October 12, 2022, the Chicago Bulls signed Drell to an Exhibit-10 contract and immediately waived him on the same day.

National team career
Junior national team

Drell competed for Estonia first time at the 2016 FIBA U16 European Championship in Radom, Poland. He helped Estonia national under-16 team to be saved from relegation while averaging a team-high 14.1 points, 7.1 rebounds per game.

Drell played at the Division B tournament of the 2018 FIBA Europe Under-18 Championship, where he was named to the All-Star Five after ranked third among all players with 19 points per game and helping his team finish in fourth place.

Senior national team

He made his debut for the senior Estonian national team on 21 February 2019, in a 2019 FIBA Basketball World Cup qualifier against Serbia, scoring 4 points in a 71–70 home victory.

In February 2021, Drell posted 12 points including a game-winning shot and three rebounds in 28 minutes in a 105–101 victory over Italy, resulting Estonia to reach their third Eurobasket tournament in the century. He finished Eurobasket 2022 qualification averaging 7.8 points and 2.4 rebounds in 5 games.

As a member of the senior Estonian national team, Drell had a break-out tournament at the Eurobasket 2022, where he recorded 20 points, shooting 8-of-12 from the field, with three rebounds in a blowout win against Great Britain, earning him "TLC Player Of The Game" award. Drell finished the tournament averaging 8.6 points while shooting 40% from three point line and grabbing 5 rebounds per game, in 25 minutes per game, helping small Estonia to finish 19th out of 24.

Personal life
Henri Drell is from basketball background. His father was a former professional basketball player who played for Kalev. Also his mother and sister were professional basketball players and were part of Estonia women's national basketball team.

Career statistics

Domestic leagues

Estonia national team

|-
| style="text-align:left;"| 2016
| style="text-align:left;"| 2016 FIBA Europe Under-16 Championship
| style="text-align:left;"| Estonia U-16
| 7 || 7 || 25.1 || .376 || .294 || .818 || 7.1 || 1.9 || 2.1 || .6 || 14.1
|-
| style="text-align:left;"| 2017
| style="text-align:left;"| 2017 FIBA U18 European Championship Division B
| style="text-align:left;"| Estonia U-18
| 8 || 8 || 24.3 || .416 || .314 || .833 || 4.4 || 2.1 || 1.2 || .6 || 12.5
|-
| style="text-align:left;"| 2018
| style="text-align:left;"| 2018 FIBA Europe Under-18 Championship Division B
| style="text-align:left;"| Estonia U-18
| 7 || 7 || 26.8 || .469 || .333 || .861 || 5.7 || 1.7 || 1.4 || .7 || 19.0
|-
| style="text-align:left;"| 2019
| style="text-align:left;"| 2019 Basketball World Cup qualification
| style="text-align:left;"| Estonia
| 2 || 0 || 13.8 || .545 || .333 || .833 || .0 || .5 || 1.5 || .0 || 9.0
|-
| style="text-align:left;"| 2020
| style="text-align:left;"| EuroBasket 2022 qualification
| style="text-align:left;"| Estonia
| 5 || 0 || 18.5 || .438 || .462 || .556 || 2.4 || .8 || .8 || .6 || 7.8
|-
| style="text-align:left;"| 2022
| style="text-align:left;"| EuroBasket 2022
| style="text-align:left;"| Estonia
| 5 || 5 || 25.0 || .459 || .400 || 1.000 || 5.0 || 1.8 || 1.4 || .8 || 8.6

Awards and accomplishments 
Professional career

 Italian Basketball Cup Best Offensive Player (2021)

References

External links
Henri Drell at basket.ee
Henri Drell at fiba.com
Henri Drell at legabasket.it (in Italian)
Henri Drell at draftexpress.com
Henri Drell at Twitter

2000 births
Living people
Brose Bamberg players
Baunach Young Pikes players
Estonian expatriate basketball people in Germany
Estonian expatriate basketball people in Italy
Estonian men's basketball players
Korvpalli Meistriliiga players
Lega Basket Serie A players
Small forwards
Basketball players from Tallinn
Victoria Libertas Pallacanestro players
Estonian expatriate basketball people in the United States
Windy City Bulls players